Colorado Referendum F was a referendum held in Colorado, United States, in 2006, and proposed to change the requirements for recalling elected officials, allowing the state legislature to relax deadlines for protesting recall petitions. The effect of this measure will be to make it more difficult to recall an elected state official. The referendum was turned down by 55.3% of voters.

Results

See also
 List of Colorado ballot measures

External links
 Legislative Council ballot analysis
 Ballot question language
 Bell Policy Center 2006 Voter's Guide analysis

References 

2006 Colorado ballot measures